Zelda Popkin (née Feinberg; 5 July 1898 – 25 May 1983) was an American writer of novels and mystery stories. She created Mary Carner, one of the first professional female private detectives in fiction. Carner was a store detective who appeared in five novels.

Life
Zelda Popkin was married to Louis Popkin, and together they ran a small public relations firm until his death. They had two children, Roy and Richard.

Work
Popkin's most successful book was The Journey Home, published in 1945, which sold nearly a million copies. Small Victory, published in 1947, was one of the first American novels with a Holocaust theme, and Quiet Street (1951) was the first American novel about the creation of the state of Israel.

She also wrote an autobiography, Open Every Door (1956), chronicling her childhood, life with her husband Louis Popkins, and life after his death.  Herman Had Two Daughters (1968), a novel about two young Jewish women growing up in a small Pennsylvania town, is also largely autobiographical.

Awards 
 1952 Jewish National Book Award for Quiet Street

Books

Mary Carner Crime Series
 Death Wears a White Gardenia (1938)
 Time Off for Murder (1940)
 Murder in the Mist (1940)
 Dead Man's Gift (1941)
 No Crime for a Lady (1942)

Novels
 So Much Blood (1944)
 Journey Home (1945)
 Small Victory (1947)
 Walk Through the Valley (1949)
 Quiet Street (1951)
 Open Every Door (1956)
 Herman Had Two Daughters (1968)
 A Death of Innocence (1971)
 Dear Once (1975)

Non fiction autobiography
 Open Every Door (1956)

References

External links
 FantasticFiction
 http://www.uky.edu/~popkin
 http://www.uky.edu/~popkin/zelda.htm

1898 births
1983 deaths
20th-century American novelists
American mystery writers
American women novelists
Jewish American novelists
Jewish women writers
Women mystery writers
20th-century American women writers
Plainfield High School (New Jersey) alumni
20th-century American Jews